He's Your Dog, Charlie Brown is the fifth prime-time animated TV special based upon the popular comic strip Peanuts, by Charles M. Schulz. It was originally broadcast on the CBS network on February 14, 1968.

Plot
Snoopy's persistent mischief is angering the other kids in the neighborhood, and they all demand that Charlie Brown do something about it because "He's your dog, Charlie Brown!"

In a letter to the Daisy Hill Puppy Farm, Charlie Brown writes that he is going to send Snoopy back for a refresher course in obedience.  Snoopy loathes the idea, but Charlie Brown tells him it is for his own good. As it is a two-day trip, Charlie Brown calls Peppermint Patty and asks to let Snoopy stay there for one night en route; Peppermint Patty agrees, but a scheming Snoopy decides to stay on and has her waiting on him hand and foot, which confuses her.

A week later, the Puppy Farm calls and informs Charlie Brown that Snoopy never showed up. When he finds out that he is still at Peppermint Patty's house, Charlie Brown goes over to her house with a leash to take Snoopy home, but the dog escapes and runs back. Peppermint Patty lets Snoopy stay, but instead of returning to the easy life he enjoyed before, she puts him to work doing menial chores.

Later, when Lucy and Linus both start to miss Snoopy, Charlie Brown tries again to bring him home, but Snoopy breaks the leash and sends Charlie Brown away.  Devastated by Snoopy's refusal to return home, the kids, along with Charlie Brown, cry, "Snoopy, come home!" That night, while doing dishes, Snoopy becomes infuriated and angrily starts breaking dishes, and Peppermint Patty puts him in the garage as punishment. While there, Snoopy realizes that he had a better life at home and starts to howl incessantly. When Peppermint Patty comes out to check on him, he knocks her down, dashes out the garage, gathers all his belongings from inside the house and runs back home to an overjoyed Charlie Brown, with whom he compromises on promising to behave if his master doesn't send him away. The next day, after taking Linus on a wild blanket ride and picking a fight with Lucy, the gang is also glad that Snoopy is back. Contented, Snoopy goes to nap on his dog house.

Cast
Peter Robbins as Charlie Brown
Bill Melendez as Snoopy
Sally Dryer as Lucy van Pelt
Christopher Shea as Linus van Pelt
Gail DeFaria as Peppermint Patty
Glenn Mendelson as Schroeder
Ann Altieri as Violet
Lisa DeFaria as Patty
Matthew Liftin as 5

Roy appears but does not have a speaking role.

Credits
Created and Written by: Charles M. Schulz
Produced and Directed by: Bill Melendez
Executive Producer: Lee Mendelson
Original Score Composed and Performed by: Vince Guaraldi
Arranged and Conducted by: John Scott Trotter
Graphic Blandishment by: Ruth Kissane, Frank Smith, Dean Spille, Beverly Robbins, Bob Carlson, Ed Levitt, Frank Braxton, Bernard Gruver, Dick Thompson, Bill Littlejohn, Phil Roman, Bob Matz, Eleanor Warren, Faith Kovaleski, Manuel Perez, Jan Green, Gwenn Dotzler
Editing: Robert T. Gillis
Assisted by: Steven Melendez
Sound by: Producers' Sound Service
Camera: Nick Vasu

Production notes
He's Your Dog, Charlie Brown was the last Peanuts special featuring the majority of the original voice cast from the first Peanuts special, A Charlie Brown Christmas. It was also the first special to credit Bill Melendez as the voice of Snoopy.

Both He's Your Dog, Charlie Brown and You're in Love, Charlie Brown were nominated for an Emmy award for Outstanding Achievement in Children's Programming in 1968.

Stock footage from It's the Great Pumpkin, Charlie Brown (1966) is used when Snoopy flies on his doghouse.

The ending segment where Snoopy and Lucy quarrel was inspired by a comic strip storyline that originally ran May 24–29, 1965. It was later adapted for The Charlie Brown and Snoopy Show (1983) episode "Snoopy: Man's Best Friend" and the French television series Peanuts (2014) episode "L'amour du risque".

Music score
The score was recorded by the Vince Guaraldi Quintet on January 11, 1968, at United Western Recorders, featuring John Gray (guitar), Frank Strozier (alto saxophone, flute), Ralph Peña (bass), and Colin Bailey (drums).

"Red Baron" (version 1)
"Red Baron" (version 2)
"" (version 1)
"" (version 2)
"Peppermint Patty" (version 1)
"" (version 3)
"Bon Voyage"
"Peppermint Patty" (version 2)
"Oh, Good Grief" (Vince Guaraldi, Lee Mendelson)
"Happiness Theme"
"Charlie Brown and His All-Stars"
"Red Baron" (version 3)
"Schroeder's Wolfgang" (variation of "Choro," from the Guaraldi/Bola Sete album From All Sides)
"Red Baron" (version 4)
"Housewife Theme" (flute variation of "Pebble Beach", version 1)
"Beethoven Theme" (retitled version of "Schroeder")
"Housewife Theme" (flute variation of "Pebble Beach", version 2)
"Blue Charlie Brown" (slow version)
"The Red Baron" (version 5, minor key)
"" (version 4)
"Linus and Lucy"
"" (version 5, end credits)

However, variations of "Peppermint Patty", "The Red Baron," "Oh, Good Grief," "Linus and Lucy," and the eponymous theme song (mistitled "It's Your Dog, Charlie Brown"), were released on the 1968 album Oh Good Grief!.

Home media
He's Your Dog, Charlie Brown was rebroadcast yearly on CBS between February 1969 and June 1972.

The special was first released on home media in 1982 on RCA's SelectaVision CED format, along with Be My Valentine, Charlie Brown, It's the Easter Beagle, Charlie Brown, and Life Is a Circus, Charlie Brown. It was later released on VHS in 1987 by Hi-Tops Video. Snoopy Double Feature Vol. 2, a VHS release containing He's Your Dog and It's Flashbeagle, Charlie Brown, was released on March 9, 1994 (it would later be re-issued in 1997 after Viacom bought Paramount). The first DVD release came on July 7, 2009, in remastered form as part of the DVD box set Peanuts 1960s Collection. A separate DVD of the special and Life Is a Circus, Charlie Brown was released on September 21, 2010.

References

External links

Peanuts television specials
Television shows directed by Bill Melendez
1968 television specials
1968 in American television
1960s American animated films
1960s American television specials
1960s animated television specials
CBS television specials
Television shows written by Charles M. Schulz